Knut Trygve Gysler (21 February 1888 – 22 May 1967) was a Norwegian equestrian. He was born in Christiania. He competed at the 1920 Summer Olympics in Antwerp, where he placed 9th in individual eventing. He competed at the 1928 Summer Olympics in Amsterdam, where he tied 21st in individual jumping, and placed 11th in team jumping.

Gysler was an officer (rittmeister in the cavalry) in the Norwegian Army, and fought in the Norwegian Campaign of World War II. Between 1930 and 1940 he also ran and owned the Hippodromen riding center in Oslo. One of his riding pupils were the Norwegian queen, Queen Maud (1869–1938).

References

External links

1888 births
1967 deaths
Sportspeople from Oslo
Norwegian male equestrians
Olympic equestrians of Norway
Equestrians at the 1920 Summer Olympics
Equestrians at the 1928 Summer Olympics
Norwegian Army personnel of World War II
20th-century Norwegian people